Jérémy Moreau  (born 22 July 1980 in Bourges) is a French professional footballer currently playing for French club US Colomiers..

External links

1980 births
Living people
French footballers
Toulouse FC players
FC Rouen players
OGC Nice players
US Orléans players
Ligue 2 players
Association football goalkeepers
Sportspeople from Bourges
Footballers from Centre-Val de Loire